This is a list of Belgian television related events from 1988.

Events
27 February - Reynaert is selected to represent Belgium at the 1988 Eurovision Song Contest with his song "Laissez briller le soleil". He is selected to be the thirty-third Belgian Eurovision entry during Eurosong held at the RTBF Studios in Brussels.

Debuts

Television shows

1980s
Tik Tak (1981-1991)

Ending this year

Births
22 January - Eline De Munck, actress, singer & TV host
9 June - Vincent Banić, actor, VJ & model
19 August - Niels Destadsbader, actor, TV host & singer

Deaths